, better known by the stage name , is a Japanese kabuki and film actor.

Life
Born in Tokyo, the son of kabuki actor Nakamura Shidō I, young Nakamura made his kabuki debut at the age of eight. He took the name Shidō the following year, following his father's retirement. Twenty-one years later, despite being a relative latecomer to the silver screen, the 30-year-old Kabuki actor was in his first film, Ping Pong (2002), in which he portrayed a skin-headed, demonically intense table tennis champion nicknamed Dragon. His film debut won Nakamura a Best Newcomer award at the 2003 Japanese Academy Awards. Since then, Nakamura has starred in a string of high-profile movies as well as TV dramas.

In May 2017, he announced that he will take a hiatus for his lung cancer treatment.

International fame
Nakamura came to international attention in 2004 after starring in the highly successful romance movie Ima, Ai ni Yukimasu (Be With You) with Yūko Takeuchi, the two stars playing a couple separated by death. The two married for a short time after filming was complete, from May 10, 2005 until they divorced on February 29, 2008.

In the Hong Kong/China martial arts movie Fearless starring international kung fu star Jet Li, and set in 1910s Imperial China, Nakamura plays a Japanese sword expert who is Jet Li's final opponent. He also has a choice role in Clint Eastwood's Letters from Iwo Jima.

Filmography

Films

TV series
NHK Taiga dramas
Kasuga no Tsubone (1989), Inaba Masasada
Mōri Motonari (1997), Amago Yoshihisa
Musashi (2003), Tokugawa Hidetada
Shinsengumi! (2004), Takimoto Sutesuke
Yae's Sakura (2013), Sagawa Kanbei
Idaten (2019), Sanetsugu Kanakuri
The 13 Lords of the Shogun (2022), Kajiwara Kagetoki
Kisarazu Cat's Eye (TBS, 2002)
HR (Fuji TV, 2003)
Akai Tsuki (TV Tokyo, 2004), Himuro Keisuke
Death Note (NTV, 2006)
Tenka Souran (TV Tokyo, 2006)
Shinjitsu no Shuki BC-kyu Senpan Kato Tetsutaro: Watashi wa Kai ni Naritai (NTV, 2007)
Ushi ni Negai wo: Love & Farm (Fuji TV, 2007)
Sexy Voice and Robo (NTV, 2007, ep1 and 11)
Ri Kouran (TV Tokyo, 2007)
Wachigaiya Itosato (TBS, 2007)
Nikutai no Mon (TV Asahi, 2008)
Kiri no Hi (NTV, 2008)
Mori no Asagao (TV Tokyo, 2010, ep1)
Totto TV (2016, NHK), Kiyoshi Atsumi
Death Note: New Generation (2016, Hulu), Ryuk (voice)
Bones of Steel (2020, Wowow), Gorō Nishida

Japanese dub
 The Amazing Spider-Man 2 as Max Dillon / Electro (Jamie Foxx)
 Spider-Man: No Way Home as Max Dillon / Electro (Jamie Foxx)
 Venom as Venom (Tom Hardy)
 Venom: Let There Be Carnage as Venom (Tom Hardy)

Video Games
 Ryū ga Gotoku 3 (2009), as Yoshitaka Mine
 Ryū ga Gotoku Ishin! (2014), as Hijikata Toshizō

Endorsements
UC Card (2005)

References

Kabuki techō: Kabuki Official Data Book 2008. Nihon Haiyū Kyōkai (Japan Actors' Association). 2008: Tokyo. p175.

External links
  Nakamura Shido Kabuki actors profile 
 
 Shido Nakamura profile on HogaCentral
 jdorama entry

1972 births
Living people
Kabuki actors
Japanese male film actors
Japanese male television actors
Japanese male video game actors
Japanese male voice actors
Male actors from Tokyo
20th-century Japanese male actors
21st-century Japanese male actors